Krügers Woche is a German television series.

External links
 

2007 German television series debuts
2007 German television series endings
German-language television shows
ProSieben original programming